AGN-2979 is a glutarimide tryptophan hydroxylase activation inhibitor. It shows antidepressant properties in rodent models of depression.

References 

Glutarimides
O-methylated phenols
Tryptophan hydroxylase inhibitors
Dimethylamino compounds